Doretta Frenna Smith (1924–2012) was an artist born and raised in Trieste, Italy. She was known for her impressionist realism watercolors.  Her higher education in Italy includes; Magistrale Institute, The Technical Institute of Accounting, Commercial Institute of Comtometry, Berliz School of Languages, Enenkel School of Art and Design and Popolare University. She married an American serviceman at the end of World War II in Trieste Italy and moved to the United States in December 1948 and settled in Jacksonville, North Carolina where she lived out her life.  She put her work aside for several years to raise eight children.  Being inspired in 1971 while watching her oldest son graduate from East Carolina University, she resumed her studies by attending art lectures, demonstration classes from regionally known artists, as well as attending classes at St John Museum of Art in Wilmington NC, Coastal Carolina Community College in Jacksonville NC, Pitt Technical Institute in Greenville NC and Fayetteville Technical Institute.  She greatly valued the opportunity to attend an art seminar conducted by Fredrick Taubes of New York City which inspired her style.  In 1973 she began teaching art at Coastal Carolina Community College until 1978 where she turned to painting full-time.   Her life in Italy during World War II had a profound effect on her work.  She used her art to help her erase the memories of the war. Her first set of paintings where scenes from her childhood, that she called her "Italian Collection".  Most of the "Italian Collection" were oil paintings, a media that she used early in her career before switching to watercolor. In the late 1970s she began painting local scenes of eastern North Carolina, floral and other areas of interest. She often painted with opera playing in the background and had commented that the music creates the mood that she would translate visually.  Her watercolors often produced startling results which added to the spiritual dimension while leaving something to the imagination of the viewer.  Her awards for her art are in the hundreds with numerous one person shows. She had many private collectors from all around the world to include, Italy, Germany, South America, China and Russia.

References

1924 births
2012 deaths
American watercolorists
20th-century American women artists
Women watercolorists
Italian emigrants to the United States
21st-century American women